Gynanisa is a genus of moths in the family Saturniidae first described by Francis Walker in 1855.

Species
Gynanisa arba (Darge, 2008)
Gynanisa ata Strand, 1911
Gynanisa basquini Bouyer, 2008
Gynanisa campionea (Signoret, 1845)
Gynanisa carcassoni Rougeot, 1974
Gynanisa commixta (Darge, 2008)
Gynanisa hecqui Darge, 1992
Gynanisa jama Rebel, 1915
Gynanisa kenya (Darge, 2008)
Gynanisa maja (Klug, 1836)
Gynanisa meridiei (Darge, 2008)
Gynanisa minettii Darge, 2002
Gynanisa murphyi Bouyer, 2001
Gynanisa thiryi Bouyer, 1992
Gynanisa uganda (Darge, 2008)
Gynanisa westwoodi Rothschild, 1895
Gynanisa zimba (Darge, 2008)

References

Saturniinae